Zero-G is a company developing sound libraries, sound effects and loops. The company also develops singing synthesizers using the Vocaloid engine developed by Yamaha Corporation.

Products

Vocaloid products 

Zero-G developed an English edition of Vocaloid software.  They subsequently were given recommendations by Crypton Future Media to Yamaha Corporation. The company then went on to releasing both the first Vocaloid voices and the first English voices.  The first Vocaloids, Leon and Lola, were released by Zero-G on 3 March 2004, both of which were sold as a "Virtual Soul Vocalist". Leon and Lola made their first appearance at the NAMM Show on 15 January 2004. Leon and Lola were also demonstrated at the Zero-G Limited booth during Wired Nextfest and won the 2005 Electronic Musician Editor's Choice Award. Zero-G later released Miriam, with her voice provided by Miriam Stockley, in July 2004. A patch was later released to update all Vocaloid engines to Vocaloid 1.1.2, adding new features to the software, although there were differences between the output results of the engine.

After interest in Vocaloids grew, Zero-G began reselling their Vocaloid products again on their website, and were considering to update their box art to match current Vocaloid trends better.

Vocaloid2 products 

Zero-G's first Vocaloid 2 product, Prima, came out on 14 January 2008 with voice of a Soprano opera singer. The second Vocaloid 2 product, Sonika, is marketed as being able to speak any language, even though she is primarily an English vocalist.

An edition of Sonika was released in Taiwan on 1 August 2010. Users can choose to use the original English or traditional Chinese interface, however it does not have a Chinese language input method or a Chinese singing voice. This is the first edition of Vocaloid software widely released to speakers of Chinese.

Their third installment in the Vocaloid 2 series, Tonio, is a classical singer designed to be able to sing in the Tenor - Baritone range and a partner to Prima.

Released products

Vocaloid3 Products 

Zero-G has released a Celtic voicebank which later became AVANNA.

Released products

Vocaloid4 products 

Zero-G released two Vocaloid4 voicebanks that are rock based.

Released products

References

External links
Zero-G website

Vocaloid production companies